The Bucca tornado was one of the most violent tornadoes ever observed in Australia, being the first Australian tornado to be officially rated F4 on the Fujita scale. It occurred near the township of Bucca (near Bundaberg) in Queensland on 29 November 1992 at around 2:20pm AEST. The tornado was accompanied by cricket-ball sized hail across Bucca and Bullyard regions.

The tornado damaged or destroyed nine houses, some flattened to the ground. Trees were snapped and stones were found embedded into tree trunks. Several tree saplings were speared into the walls of homes. A refrigerator from one home was blown away and never found. A 3-ton truck was also thrown  and approximately 20 cattle were killed. Jeff Callaghan, a retired senior severe weather forecaster at the Bureau of Meteorology said “the Bucca tornado was rated a F4 or possibly an F5.” Although the most violent Australian tornado with an official rating, the tornado did not kill or seriously injure anyone.

The weather system that spawned the Bucca tornado was also responsible for an F3 tornado at Oakhurst.

See also 
1992 Queensland storms
List of Southern Hemisphere tornadoes and tornado outbreaks

References

Tornadoes in Australia
1992 in Australia
Tornadoes of 1992
November 1992 events in Australia